Jafta Kgalabi Masemola (December 12, 1931 – April 17, 1990), also known as The Tiger of Azania and Bra Jeff, was a South African anti-apartheid activist, teacher, and founder of the armed wing of the Pan Africanist Congress (PAC). He spent 27 years in South African prison during the apartheid era in South Africa, and was released in October 1989, shortly before the legalization of the PAC and the African National Congress by F. W. de Klerk.
He served the longest sentence of any political prisoner in Robben Island prison in South Africa.

Masemola was a teacher in Atteridgeville township in Pretoria in the 1950s.

Together with Robert Sobukwe, Masemola co-founded PAC in 1959 in Soweto.  Subsequently, he worked for PAC's youth organization in Atteridgeville and then headed PAC's military wing, Poqo.

In 1962 Masemola was arrested and convicted on the charge of smuggling individuals out of the country for military training and blowing up power lines. He was imprisoned at Robben Island.

He was released from the prison on the 15 October 1989 together with ANC members Ahmed Kathrada, Raymond Mhlaba, Wilton Mkwayi, Andrew Mlangeni, Oscar Mpetha, Elias Motsoaledi and Walter Sisulu.

Masemola was killed in a car accident shortly after his release in 1990.

References

1929 births
1990 deaths
Anti-apartheid activists
Members of the Order of Luthuli